Walter “Wattie” Boone, was a pioneer distiller. He built the first distillery in the area of Knob Creek in LaRue County. Historians agree that Boone was one of the first to be documented producing Bourbon whiskey in Kentucky in 1776. According to local folklore the father of Abraham Lincoln, Thomas accepted a job at the Boone Distillery in 1814.

Boone was a pioneer to the area. It was a time of sieges and skirmishes with local tribes. Boone would have been part of a group of settlers who travelled through the Cumberland Gap, at the time Samuel Goodwin, founded Goodin or Goodwin Fort, as a frontier settlement of Virginia.

Following the American Revolutionary War more settlers arrived. By the time Kentucky established statehood over this area, Boone’s neighbor, Aaron Atherton and his son, Peter Atherton (1771-1844) had been operating a small distillery on the banks of Rolling Fork River at Knob Creek for over thirty years, since around 1790 making them also one of the first whiskey pioneers of Kentucky. A legacy that continued the next generation to Jonnie Boone and his brother, William.

Personal
He was the son of Charles Boone (1725-1783) and Mary Boarman, and was born in Prince George's County, Maryland. His grandparents were John Boone (1678-1876) and Elizabeth Bevan.

Know also as Waddie, he was born circa 1760. He died before April 12, 1847 in Pottinger's Creek, also known as Rolling Fork, in Nelson County, Kentucky.  Pottinger's Station was the site of one of the forts which protected the early settlement of Bardstown, was built by Samuel Pottinger, soldier in Revolution, who first saw the land in 1778 which he came from Maryland with troops of Capt. James Harrod. In 1781 Pottinger returned with his family and built station. It was often used as a refuge for other settlers migrating to Kentucky.

Boone first married Mildred Edelen (1763-1810) and had 6 children.  He married as his second wife,  Elizabeth Havana on March 27, 1818 in Nelson County, Kentucky.

Legacy
Boone is one of the likely candidates as to the person who invented bourbon; the other candidates being Evan Williams, or Boone’s partner, James Richie. Nevertheless, bourbon was named America’s native spirit by U.S. Congress in 1964. Some of his descendants have been involved with brands such as Maker's Mark.

The Boone name has recently been commercialized by Preservation Distillery.

See also
 Athertonville, Kentucky
 Knob Creek Farm

References

People from LaRue County, Kentucky
American brewers